Gerbrand Bakker may refer to:

 Gerbrand Bakker (physician) (1771–1828), Dutch physician and professor
 Gerbrand Bakker (novelist) (born 1962), Dutch writer